Dziwny jest ten świat ("Strange is this World") is Czesław Niemen's first solo album, released in 1967. At 20 December 1968, as first album in Poland, "Dziwny jest ten świat" was awarded with Golden record (160 000 copies sold).

Track listing 
 "Gdzie to jest" – 2:55 (music Czesław Niemen, lyrics Marta Bellan)
 "Nigdy się nie dowiesz" – 3:30 (music and lyrics Czesław Niemen)
 "Ten los, zły los" – 2:40 (music Czesław Niemen, lyrics Krzysztof Dzikowski)
 "Coś co kocham najwięcej" – 3:05 (music Czesław Niemen, lyrics Jacek Grań)
 "Wspomnienie" – 3:48 (muz. Marek Sart, lyrics Julian Tuwim)
 "Nie wstawaj lewą nogą" – 2:12 (music and lyrics Czesław Niemen)
 "Dziwny jest ten świat" – 3:34 (music and lyrics Czesław Niemen)
 "Jeszcze swój egzamin zdasz" – 1:54 (music Marian Zimiński, lyrics Marek Gaszyński)
 "Chciałbym cofnąć czas" – 3:51 (music and lyrics Czesław Niemen)
 "Pamiętam ten dzień" – 3:12 (music and lyrics Czesław Niemen)
 "Nie dla mnie taka dziewczyna" – 2:27 (music Czesław Niemen, lyrics Jacek Grań)
 "Chyba, że mnie pocałujesz" – 2:57 (music Czesław Niemen, lyrics Jacek Grań)
 "Jaki kolor wybrać chcesz" – 2:22 (music Marian Zimiński, lyrics Marek Gaszyński, CC and CD bonus track)
 "Proszę, przebacz" – 3:09 (music Czesław Niemen, lyrics Marek Gaszyński, CC and CD bonus track)
 "Domek bez adresu" – 2:22 (music Andrzej Korzyński, lyrics Andrzej Tylczyński, CC and CD bonus track)

Personnel 
 Czesław Niemen – vocal, piano, organ
 Paweł Brodowski – bass
 Tomasz Butowtt – drums
 Tomasz Jaśkiewicz – guitar
 Marian Zimiński – piano, organ
 Alibabki – background vocals

See also 
 It's a Man's Man's Man's World - Released 1966, inspiration for 'Dziwny jest ten świat'.

References

Czesław Niemen albums
1967 debut albums
Polish-language albums
Polskie Nagrania Muza albums